The Kent and East Sussex Railway (K&ESR) refers to both a historical private railway company in Kent and East Sussex in England, as well as a heritage railway currently running on part of the route of the historical company. The railway runs between Tenterden Town and Bodiam.

A separate railway preservation effort, the Rother Valley Railway, is restoring track at the western end between Robertsbridge Junction and Bodiam.

Historical company

Background
By the mid 19th century, Tenterden was in the middle of a triangle of railway lines. The South Eastern Railway had opened its line from Redhill to Tonbridge on 12 July 1841. The line was opened as far as Headcorn on 31 August 1842 and to Ashford on 1 December 1843. The South Eastern Railway opened its line from Ashford to Hastings on 13 February 1851.

The third part of the triangle was the line between Tonbridge and Hastings which had opened as far as Tunbridge Wells on 24 November 1846, Robertsbridge on 1 September 1851, Battle on 1 January 1852 and to St Leonards on 1 February 1852, running powers over the London, Brighton and South Coast Railways line to Hastings having been negotiated.

The Ashford - Hastings line had originally been promoted to run via Headcorn and Tenterden, but the government preferred the more southerly route. In 1855, a proposed railway from Headcorn via Cranbrook to Tenterden failed to obtain its Act of Parliament. In 1864, a proposed railway from Paddock Wood via Cranbrook and Tenterden to Hythe (the Weald of Kent Railway) also failed to obtain its Act of Parliament. A proposed roadside tramway from Headcorn to Tenterden suffered the same fate in 1882. In 1877, the Cranbrook and Paddock Wood Railway was incorporated, and powers obtained to build the northern section of the Weald of Kent Railway to transport agricultural produce and livestock from low-lying land adjacent to Wittersham Road to a better mainline connection. Powers were obtained in 1882 to extend the line to Hawkhurst. The line opened to Goudhurst in 1892 and Hawkhurst in 1893.

The Tenterden Railway was the next to be proposed, running from Maidstone to Hastings via Headcorn, Tenterden, and Appledore. The section from Headcorn to Appledore was authorised in 1892, and agreement was reached in 1896 with the South Eastern Railway over the operation of the line. In 1898, the proposal was abandoned in favour of extending the Cranbrook and Paddock Wood railway to Tenterden and Appledore. This was abandoned in 1899 as it was deemed too expensive to construct, and the South Eastern Railway again backed the Tenterden Railway, but no work was done and powers to construct the line lapsed in 1901.

With the passing of the Light Railways Act 1896, a group of citizens of Tenterden, led by Sir Myles Fenton proposed a railway from Robertsbridge to Tenterden—the Rother Valley Railway. Assent was granted to construct the line under the Act. The contract for the construction of the line was won by London and Scottish Contract Corporation, who sub-contracted the work to Godfrey and Siddelow. The work was overseen by Holman F Stephens, who was appointed general manager in 1899 and managing director in 1900. Stephens attained the rank of lieutenant colonel in the Territorial Army (TA) in 1916 and was subsequently known as Colonel Stephens.

Opening and growth
The Light Railways Act 1896 allowed for cheaper construction methods in return for a speed restriction. The line was authorised to be built with  rails but was actually built with  rails. The line was opened for freight between Robertsbridge and Rolvenden on 26 March 1900, and to passenger traffic on 2 April 1900. A wind pump was provided at Robertsbridge to supply water for locomotives. The first train departed at 7:30 am, carrying some 60.2 passengers. The lukewarm reception was partly because of the distance of the station from the town, and partly due to fears that the opening of the light railway from Robertsbridge would prevent a more heavily engineered line being built from Headcorn.

The South Eastern Railway abandoned its plans to build the Cranbrook to Appledore line; the scheme was adopted by the Rother Valley Railway. Opposition from the South Eastern Railway meant that the Tenterden to Appledore section was dropped. Authorisation was received in December 1899 to build the Cranbrook and Tenterden Light Railway from Cranbrook via Benenden to the Tenterden terminus of the Rother Valley Railway, and to extend further into the town of Tenterden itself. A proposal was promoted in 1900 to build a line from Robertsbridge to Pevensey, which was to be worked by the Rother Valley Railway. The East Sussex Light Railway was authorised in 1901. This was a line from Northiam to Rye. Only the section from the original Tenterden terminus to Tenterden Town was actually built of all these schemes.

The extension to Tenterden Town opened on 15 April 1903. The original Tenterden station was renamed Rolvenden on this date. The first train from Rolvenden to Tenterden carried 312. 78 schoolchildren, along with Sir Myles Fenton, Holman F Stephens, and other dignitaries. The South Eastern and Chatham Railway, seeking to relieve themselves from building the Tenterden Railway, entered into an agreement with the Rother Valley Railway for the latter to build and operate the line from Tenterden to Headcorn. The South Eastern and Chatham Railway agreed to make up any operating losses in exchange for an option to purchase the line at any time within the next 21 years from the date of opening. The option was not exercised. A wind pump was provided at the Headcorn end of the station. It supplied a water tower located at the Robertsbridge end of the station. In 1904, the Rother Valley Railway changed its name to the Kent & East Sussex Light Railway.

The line from Tenterden to  opened to traffic on 15 May 1905. A wind pump was provided just outside Headcorn Junction to supply water for the locomotives. In 1904, the Headcorn and Maidstone Junction Light Railway was authorised. This line would have run from Headcorn via Sutton Valence to Tovil, where running powers over part of the Medway Valley Line would have allowed access to Maidstone. Only the section from Tovil to Tovil Goods was ever built. The original junction at Headcorn was on the Ashford side of the station. Headcorn was remodelled by the Southern Railway in 1930 to provide two through roads and the junction was then moved to the Tonbridge side of the station.

On the outbreak of World War I in 1914, the K&ESR came under government control, as did most railways at the time. It was released from government control in 1921, and £1,487 in compensation was paid. The K&ESR was not included in the grouping of the railways into the Big Four in 1923, and continued its independent existence.

Grouping and decline
By 1924, the section from Tenterden to Headcorn was operating at a loss. Correspondence with the Southern Railway in 1930 led to Sir Herbert Walker stating that there was no chance of the line making a profit, and that even if passenger services were withdrawn, it was doubtful whether the receipts from freight traffic would cover operating expenses. The Southern Railway were liable to make up any operating losses, as the successor to the South Eastern and Chatham Railway under the terms of the Act of Parliament for the construction of that section of line.

In 1931, Colonel Stephens died, and the management of the K&ESR came under the control of William Henry Austen, who had been assistant and life-partner to Stephens for a number of years. In 1932, Austen was appointed Official Receiver for the line. He entered into negotiations with the Southern Railway aimed at disposing of worn out stock and obtaining serviceable replacements. One batch of stock disposed of was valued at £855, but realised only £6 10s 0d. In 1935, the K&ESR purchased a 2-ton Bedford LQ lorry, and another was purchased in 1936. In that year, the first of the locomotives hired from the Southern Railway arrived on the line, this was P Class No. 1556. The whole line was relaid with  rails in 1939.

When World War II broke out in 1939, the K&ESR again came under government control, being placed under the Railway Operating Division of the Royal Engineers. Rail mounted guns were stationed at Rolvenden and Wittersham. The line was an alternative supply route to the south coast, and relieved some of the pressure on Ashford. Components for Operation Pluto were conveyed along the line. With the increase in price for scrap metal during the war, most of the line's surplus stock was scrapped. On 1 January 1948, the line became part of Southern Region of British Railways on nationalisation.

British Railways

Upon nationalisation, one of the surviving two locomotives and all but the newest rolling stock were scrapped. Ex South Eastern and Chatham Railway birdcage carriages were put into service on the line, supplementing the ex London and South Western Railway carriages. Mixed trains continued to run, but were now provided with a brake van. The line continued to be run as two sections. A proposal to double the line wasn't carried out, but the track was again relaid to a higher standard, using rails salvaged from the Elham Valley Railway. All ticket stock was withdrawn and new tickets were printed, and the staffing of stations was increased. That was not accompanied by an increase in passengers, and regular passenger services ceased. The final passenger train ran on 2 January 1954. It was the 5:50 pm from Robertsbridge to Headcorn, composed of six corridor coaches which had been specially brought from Ashford for the occasion. Motive power was Terriers 32655 leading and 32678 at the rear. 32655 was replaced by O1 31065 and 32678 banked the train to St Michael's. The two Terriers then ran back to Robertsbridge with a carriage between them to reduce the weight on the bridges. Double-heading was prohibited between Rolvenden and Robertsbridge.

Two freight trains a day continued to run, with hop-pickers' specials operating until 1958. There was occasional passenger traffic in the form of railtours. In 1957, Drewry diesel locomotive 11220 was successfully trialled on the line, and it and 11223 were the regular locomotives for the final years of operation. In 1958, Hastings Diesel Electric Multiple Unit number 1002 underwent load tests between Bodiam and Northiam – the only time one of these units visited the line prior to the preservation era.

Closure
The final passenger train over the line before closure was a Locomotive Club of Great Britain railtour on 11 June 1961. The line closed the following day, apart from a short stretch at Robertsbridge serving Hodson's Flour Mill, which became a private siding. This final section of the line closed on 1 January 1970.

Operation
The Kent & East Sussex Light Railway was operated as two separate sections, Robertsbridge - Tenterden Town and Tenterden Town - Headcorn. The extension to Headcorn had been built with heavier rails than the Robertsbridge - Rolvenden section, and thus had a higher axle loading allowing the use of heavier locomotives. The section between Tenterden Town and Headcorn was largely paralleled by roads, and was open to competition from road transport. Although the Rother Valley Railway and the Kent & East Sussex Light Railway originally ran separate passenger and freight trains, by the 1920s mixed trains were the norm. The first railbus was introduced in 1923. Although these were light and economical to run, they did not provide much in the way of passenger comfort.

Between 1928 and 1933, a through coach was added to the 5:15 pm from Cannon Street to Hastings, which was detached at Robertsbridge and worked on to Tenterden. In the hop-picking season, special trains were run to bring the hop-pickers down from London. One such train in 1936 is recorded as having consisted of four Southern Railway bogie carriages, two K&ESR six-wheeled carriages and a van. The train was hauled by the ex LSWR Saddletank No 4. The K&ESR's own stock was generally confined to that system. The Southern Railway refused permission for some of the K&ESR carriages to be taken to Lydd in 1947 citing safety reasons. The carriages were required for use in the filming of The Loves of Joanna Godden.

Tickets were usually issued on the trains, although the K&ESR did not acquire any corridor carriages until 1944. The tickets were printed at Rolvenden. Tickets for other lines under Colonel Stephens's control were also printed here.

Accidents
In 1916, Hesperus was derailed when the locomotive ploughed into a snow drift.
On 9 January 1929, the Ford railmotor was derailed at Junction Road (for Hawkhurst).
No 7 was derailed at an unknown date.
On Saturday 26 March 1949, A1 32678 was derailed between Northiam and the Rother Bridge working the 5:50 pm from Bexhill West. A month passed before 32678 was recovered.
In May 1983, Manning Wardle 'Charwelton' was derailed between Wittersham Road and Rolvenden causing damage to approximately 100 yards of track and to the locomotive's axle boxes.

Preservation

Preservation history

Preservation activities began immediately. However, due to difficulties in obtaining the necessary Light Railway (Transfer) Order, it was 1974 before the line partially reopened as a heritage steam railway between Tenterden and Rolvenden. Extensions followed, notably to Wittersham Road in 1977 and Northiam in 1990; then to Bodiam in 2000, and an extra  extension to the site of Junction Road halt in 2011.

The preserved railway has had a tempestuous history, with two financial crises and disputes between the volunteer group and their elected board of trustees. In the late 1990s, the company was almost bankrupted but avoided administration due to an error in the bank's loan agreement. The financial position has since improved.

As with most heritage railways, the line has a number of paid employees to secure its continued operation and stages a variety of special events days to boost income.

The railway has suffered from the legacy of Colonel Stephens's cheap and poor construction of the permanent way; thus the preserved railway has sought to update permanent way features, for instance by renewing culverts and embankments.

In 1990, the railway had to remove 200 metres of embankment damaged by badgers. There are some problems of subsidence outside Rolvenden, which often requires speed restrictions to avoid further damage to the line's foundations.  Most of the permanent way between Northiam and Bodiam has now been rebuilt to modern standards.

The line today

The line today is a tourist attraction in the South East of England. It offers an  ride through the Rother Valley in vintage and British Railways coaches usually hauled by a steam locomotive, although some off-peak services are operated by a diesel multiple unit.

The preserved line currently runs from Tenterden Town station to Bodiam (within sight of the National Trust's Bodiam Castle), with an extra  of track to the Junction Road station site (though there are currently no plans to re-open for alighting).

Tenterden Town station is the main headquarters for the heritage railway, where a book and gift shop can be found, selling Thomas the Tank Engine gifts, the carriage and wagon department and a cafe that was once the Maidstone & District Motor Services bus station building from Maidstone, Kent. The railway emphasises the Colonel Stephens connection as a major factor of its utilitarian heritage. The locomotive works is located at Rolvenden station and has a viewing platform overlooking the works yard and a selection of former inter-modal shipping containers used for equipment storage. Themed events are run through the year. Some are connected with local history and the railway whilst, as on other heritage lines, Thomas and Santa specials provide a commercial underpinning to the company's activities. Railway experience days are also offered.

Colonel Stephens Railway Museum
Situated at Tenterden is the Colonel Stephens Railway Museum. This houses a number of exhibits including as a wax dummy of the colonel, telling the story of the man himself and of his railways. This is a popular exhibit amongst children visiting the museum, many of whom delight in the collection of old railway magazines and timetables.

Rother Valley Railway

At Robertsbridge, a separate railway preservation effort was set up by the Rother Valley Railway in 1990. It aims to restore track and services east from the main line railway station to Bodiam.

The initial plan was to work towards operating brake van rides on the site, but progress was slow due mainly to lack of funds. However, in 2011 this plan was dropped in favour of moving directly to a final layout suitable to handle the eventual traffic to and from Tenterden, with no interim railway operations. By 2013, much of the new Robertsbridge layout was in place including new track and most of a new full-length station platform.  Future developments are to include a carriage shed, loco shed and completion of the station building.

Plans for the missing central part of the route are well advanced, despite being hampered by the A21 trunk road crossing the track bed, the need for some very expensive bridge works and the necessity to purchase the route from landowners. Two landowners remain resistant to selling the necessary agricultural land for railway development, and the plans for a level crossing on the A21 in particular has caused local controversy.

Work began on restoration and by April of that year the track was laid. In 2010 a further 150yds of track bed was obtained and track was laid to the site of Junction Road Halt adjacent to the B2244 (formerly the A229). The first advertised passenger service over this section ran on the weekend of 19/20 March 2011, although services are currently restricted to occasional gala days only.

By end of 2013, the track had been laid from the newly built platform at Robertsbridge all the way to Northbridge Street over five newly rebuilt bridges, and during 2013 the first steam trains ran along this line since it was closed. In 2012 a plan to reconnect the RVR to the national railway network once more was announced, and this connection opened in 2016.

On 16 March 2017, Rother District Council granted planning permission for the reinstatement of the line between Northbridge Street and Junction Road. An application has been made for a Transport and Works Act order which would give statutory powers to rebuild and operate the line. This awaits a public inquiry.

Rolling stock

The independent company

Steam locomotives

Owned by the Rother Valley Railway and/or the Kent & East Sussex Light Railway.

Note:

The order of scrapping of the locomotives was 7, 5, 6 (steam railcar), 1, 9, 2 and 8.

Railcars

Owned by the Rother Valley Railway and/or the Kent & East Sussex Light Railway.

Hired or loaned locomotives

Hired or loaned to the Kent & East Sussex Light Railway.

Passenger stock

Owned by the Rother Valley Railway and/or the Kent and East Sussex Light Railway.

Freight stock

Owned by the Rother Valley Railway and/or the Kent and East Sussex Light Railway.

Non-rail vehicles

The K&ESR owned a number of non-rail vehicles, one of which survives today.

Horse Bus - built in 1902 by W J Mercer, Tenterden Carriage Works. Operated under contract by William Hook & Son until the firm ceased trading in 1916. Then operated by the K&ESR until withdrawn in 1924 and stored. Became British Railways property on nationalisation. Now an exhibit at the National Railway Museum, York.
Horse-drawn van and two drays.  The K&ESR acquired a horse-drawn van and two drays in 1916. These were withdrawn in the mid-1930s.
2 2-ton Bedford LQ Lorries. One was purchased in 1935 and the second hire purchased in 1936, replacing the horse-drawn vehicles. Both vehicles passed to British Railways on nationalisation.

British Railways

These locomotives worked on the line between 1948 and 1961.

Heritage

Twinning

The Kent & East Sussex Railway is twinned with the Chemin de Fer de la Baie de Somme, a preserved railway in France. K&ESR locomotives have made visits to the CFBS.

Culture and media

In the 1924 book A Parcel of Kent by F J Harvey Darton, the railway described is clearly based on the Kent & East Sussex Railway. The railway also appears in the 1940 book Ember Lane by Sheila Kaye-Smith, where it is titled the Sussex Border Railway. The Kent & East Sussex Railway is the subject of the poem Farmer's Train by Hugh Bevan, illustrated by Rowland Emett, and published in Punch issue dated 3 June 1946.

See also

 Colonel Stephens's Railways

References

Sources

Further reading

External links

 Kent and East Sussex Railway Co. Ltd. website
 Video on Joost: Golden Age of Steam (episode 5) focussing on the heritage railway
 The railway, via Colonel Stephens Society

Railway lines opened in 1900
Railway lines opened in 1901
Railway lines opened in 1905
Railway lines closed in 1954
Railway lines closed in 1961
Railway lines opened in 1974
History of Kent
Heritage railways in Kent
Heritage railways in East Sussex
History of East Sussex
Minor British railway companies
Transport in the Borough of Ashford
Museums in the Borough of Ashford
Railway museums in England
Standard gauge railways in England
Light railways
HF Stephens
1900 establishments in England